Revolver is an EP of outtakes made during the recording sessions of Lewis Black's first album, The White Album.

The title is a reference to the album Revolver by the Beatles.  This was done to acknowledge the fact that these were outtakes and different edits from the sessions of Black's earlier release.

Track listing
Wisconsin (unedited) – 6:54
Outtakes – 9:29
Leave a Tip – 2:33

On the vinyl version, the outtakes are divided into two parts due to the side break.

Release history
Originally released as a run of 1000 CDs.

A limited ten-inch vinyl edition of 500 was released on yellow and red sunburst vinyl.  The vinyl run includes a three-inch CD version of the same material. Notably, the vinyl is mastered with inverted grooves, so it plays from the label to the outer edge; standard vinyl records play from the outer edge towards the label.

This entire EP eventually became a hidden track on The White Album CD.

References

Lewis Black - Revolver • Discogs

Lewis Black albums
2002 EPs
Stand Up! Records albums
2000s comedy albums